Pontibacillus halophilus is a Gram-positive, moderately halophilic, strictly aerobic and motile bacterium from the genus of Pontibacillus which has been isolated from a sea urchin from the Laizhou Bay.

References

 

Bacillaceae
Bacteria described in 2009